Veronica Anne Roth (born August 19, 1988) is an American novelist and short story writer, known for her bestselling Divergent trilogy which has sold more than 35 million copies worldwide.

Personal life 
Veronica Roth was born on August 19, 1988 in New York City, and was raised primarily in Barrington, Illinois. Her mother, Barbara Ross, is a painter who resides in Barrington. She is the youngest of three children. Her parents divorced when she was five years old, and her mother has since remarried to Frank Ross, a financial consultant for landscaping companies. Her brother and sister live in the Chicago area.

Roth is of German and Polish descent. Roth says of her father: "He had a job, and worked far away. Now I have a good relationship with my stepdad." Her maternal grandparents were concentration camp survivors, whose religious convictions pushed her mother away from religion. Roth learned about Christianity by attending a Christian Bible study during her high school years, and has stayed with it.

Roth went to Grove Avenue Elementary School, Prairie Middle School, and Barrington High School. After one year at Carleton College, she transferred to Northwestern University for its creative writing program.

Roth married photographer Nelson Fitch in 2011. They reside in the Chicago area.

Career 
Roth wrote her first book, Divergent, while on winter break in her senior year at Northwestern University, and found an agent by the following March. Her career took off rapidly with the success of her Divergent, with the publishing rights sold before she graduated from college in 2010 and the film rights sold mid-March 2011, before the novel was printed in April 2011. Her first two novels sold over five million copies worldwide by fall 2013, just as the film based on the first novel was wrapping up.

Roth sold the film rights to The Divergent Series to Summit Entertainment. Filming of Divergent, the adaptation of the first book in the series, was started in April 2013, and the film was released in March 2014. On March 21, 2014, Lionsgate officially greenlit the film adaptation of Insurgent. The film was released on March 20, 2015. On April 11, 2014, Summit Entertainment announced that the third book, Allegiant, would be split into two films, part 1 and part 2. Former Part 1 is called The Divergent Series: Allegiant, and was released on March 18, 2016, and former Part 2 is named The Divergent Series: Ascendant, and was scheduled to be released on March 24, 2017. The theatrical release for Ascendant was cancelled in favor of it being a television film and spinoff series. The television film and spinoff series were later cancelled.

Roth has written four short stories from character Tobias Eaton's point of view. The Transfer is the first of four short stories, which tells some of Tobias's life prior to Divergent. It was released on September 3, 2013. The second story is titled The Initiate. The stories are sold separately as e-books and also bound together under the title Four: A Divergent Story Collection. The last two short stories of Tobias's stories are titled The Son and The Traitor. The story collection was published in several forms in July 2014. The novella Free Four: Tobias Tells the Story chapter thirteen of Divergent in Tobias's point of view, and was released for Kindle in 2012 in the United States and in 2013 in the UK.

Publisher HarperCollins announced a two-book deal with Roth for publication of two young adult novels. The first book, Carve the Mark, was published on January 17, 2017 and the sequel, titled The Fates Divide, was released on April 10, 2018. An epilogue to Divergent, titled We Can Be Mended, was announced in December 2016. It could either be purchased independently or included as an extra with a Carve the Mark pre-order.

In October 2018, HarperCollins announced another two-book deal with Roth. The first is a collection of short stories titled The End and Other Beginnings: Stories which take place in a future with advanced technology. One of the stories in the collections, Inertia, has been optioned for film adaptation by Fox 2000 Pictures.  

John Joseph Adams Books acquired Roth's book Chosen Ones for publication on April 6, 2020.

Bibliography 
 The Divergent trilogy:
 Divergent (2011)
 Insurgent (2012)
 Allegiant (2013)
 Divergent related publications:
 The World of Divergent: The Path to Allegiant (2013)
 Four: A Divergent Collection (2014), serves as prequel to the trilogy
 We Can be Mended (2017)
 The Shards and Ashes anthology:
 Hearken (2013), a short story
 Ark (2019), e-book part of Amazon's Forward kindle collection
 The Carve the Mark duology
 Carve the Mark (2017)
 The Fates Divide (2018)
  The End and Other Beginnings: Stories from the Future (2019) (collection)
 Chosen Ones (2020)
 Poster Girl (2022)
 Arch-Conspirator (2023)

 Awards 
2011 Goodreads Favorite Book for Divergent
2011 Goodreads Choice Award in Best Young Adult Fantasy (& Science Fiction) for Divergent
2012 Best Goodreads Author for Insurgent2012 Goodreads Choice Award in Best Young Adult Fantasy (& Science Fiction) for Insurgent2013 Goodreads Choice Award in Best Young Adult Fantasy (& Science Fiction) for Allegiant''

References

External links 

  Author's official site
 Review of Divergent at The Guardian
 
 
 
 

1988 births
Living people
21st-century American short story writers
21st-century American novelists
21st-century American women writers
American Christians
American people of German descent
American people of Polish descent
American science fiction writers
American short story writers
American young adult novelists
Northwestern University alumni
People from Barrington, Illinois
Novelists from Illinois
Writers from New York City
American women novelists
American women short story writers
Women writers of young adult literature
Women science fiction and fantasy writers
Writers of young adult science fiction
Novelists from New York (state)